Adilet (meaning justice) may refer to:

Adilet Law Academy in Almaty, Kazakhstan
Democratic Party Adilet in Kazakhstan
Adilet Kyshtakbekov (born 1993), runner from Kyrgyzstan